Chessy is the name or part of the name of three communes of France:

Chessy, Rhône in the Rhône département
Chessy, Seine-et-Marne in the Seine-et-Marne département
Chessy-les-Prés in the Aube Département